A list of people, who died during the 4th century, who have received recognition as Blessed (through beatification) or Saint (through canonization) from the Catholic Church:

Notes

See also 

Christianity in the 4th century
List of Church Fathers

04
 
Saints